Hyde Park is the 41st of the 77 community areas of Chicago.

Hyde Park's official boundaries are 51st Street/Hyde Park Boulevard on the north, the Midway Plaisance (between 59th and 60th streets) on the south, Washington Park on the west, and Lake Michigan on the east. According to another definition, a section to the north between 47th Street and 51st Street/Hyde Park Boulevard is also included as part of Hyde Park, although this area is officially the southern part of the Kenwood community area. The area encompassing Hyde Park and the southern part of Kenwood is sometimes referred to as Hyde Park-Kenwood, which includes the neighborhoods of East Hyde Park and Indian Village.

Hyde Park is home to a number of institutions of higher education; among these are the University of Chicago, Catholic Theological Union, Lutheran School of Theology at Chicago, and McCormick Theological Seminary. The community area is also home to the Museum of Science and Industry, and two of Chicago's four historic sites listed in the original 1966 National Register of Historic Places (Chicago Pile-1, the world's first artificial nuclear reactor, and Robie House). In the early 21st century, Hyde Park received national attention for its association with U.S. President Barack Obama, who, before running for president, was a Senior Lecturer for twelve years at the University of Chicago Law School. The Barack Obama Presidential Center which is currently under construction in Jackson Park is located nearby.

History

Founding and early years

In 1853, Paul Cornell, a real estate speculator and cousin of Cornell University founder Ezra Cornell, purchased  of land between 51st and 55th streets along the shore of Lake Michigan, with the idea of attracting other Chicago businessmen and their families to the area. The land was located seven miles south of Downtown Chicago in a rural area that enjoyed weather tempered by the lake – cooler in the summer and warmer in the winter. It was conveniently located near the Illinois Central Railroad, which had been constructed two years earlier. Cornell successfully negotiated land in exchange for a railroad station at 53rd Street. Hyde Park quickly became a suburban retreat for affluent Chicagoans who wanted to escape the noise and congestion of the rapidly growing city.

In 1857, the Hyde Park House, an upscale hotel, was built on the shore of Lake Michigan near the 53rd Street railroad station. For two decades, the Hyde Park House served as a focal point of Hyde Park social life. During this period, it was visited or lived in by many prominent guests, including Mary Todd Lincoln, who lived there with her children for two and a half months in the summer of 1865 (shortly after her husband was assassinated). The Hyde Park House burned down in an 1879 fire. The Sisson Hotel was built on the site in 1918 and was eventually converted into a condominium building (the Hampton House).

In 1861, Hyde Park was incorporated as an independent township (called Hyde Park Township). Its boundaries were Pershing Road (39th Street) on the north, 138th Street on the south, State Street on the west, and Lake Michigan and the Indiana state line on the east. The territory of the township encompassed most of what is now the South Side of Chicago. Hyde Park Township remained independent of Chicago until it was annexed to the city in 1889. After annexation, the definition of Hyde Park as a Chicago neighborhood was restricted to the historic core of the former township, centered on Cornell's initial development between 51st and 55th streets near the lakefront.

The Hyde Park Herald, the neighborhood's community newspaper, was established in 1882 and continues to be published weekly.

Growth and notability

In 1891 (two years after Hyde Park was annexed to the city of Chicago), the University of Chicago was established in Hyde Park through the philanthropy of John D. Rockefeller and the leadership of William Rainey Harper.

In 1893, Hyde Park hosted the World's Columbian Exposition (a world's fair marking the 400th anniversary of Christopher Columbus' arrival in the New World). The World's Columbian Exposition brought fame to the neighborhood, which gave rise to an inflow of new residents and spurred new development that gradually started transforming Hyde Park into a more urban area. However, since most of the structures built for the fair were temporary, it left few direct traces in the neighborhood. The only major structure from the fair that is still standing today is Charles Atwood's Palace of Fine Arts, which has since been converted into the Museum of Science and Industry.

In the early decades of the twentieth century, many upscale hotels were built in Hyde Park (mostly along the lakefront). Hyde Park became a resort area in Chicago. Most of these hotels closed during the Great Depression, and were eventually converted into apartment and condominium buildings (most of which are still standing today).

Historical images of Hyde Park can be found in Explore Chicago Collections, a digital repository made available by Chicago Collections archives, libraries and other cultural institutions in the city.

Racial integration, economic decline, and urban renewal
Until the middle of the twentieth century, Hyde Park remained an almost exclusively white neighborhood (despite its proximity to Chicago's Black Belt). Hyde Parkers relied on racially restrictive covenants to keep African Americans out of the neighborhood. At the time, the use of such covenants was supported by the University of Chicago.

After the Supreme Court banned racially restrictive covenants in 1948, African Americans began moving into Hyde Park, and the neighborhood gradually became multiracial. In 1955, civil rights activist Leon Despres was elected alderman of Hyde Park and held the position for twenty years. Despres argued passionately for racial integration and fair housing on the floor of the Chicago City Council, and became known as the "liberal conscience of Chicago" for often casting the sole dissenting vote against the policies of Chicago's then-mayor Richard J. Daley.

During the 1950s, Hyde Park experienced economic decline as a result of the white flight that followed the rapid inflow of African Americans into the neighborhood. In the 1950s and 1960s, the University of Chicago, in its effort to counteract these trends, sponsored one of the largest urban renewal plans in the nation. The plan involved the demolition and redevelopment of entire blocks of decayed buildings with the goal of creating an "interracial community of high standards." After the plan was carried out, Hyde Park's average income soared by seventy percent, but its African American population fell by forty percent, since the substandard housing primarily occupied by low-income African Americans had been purchased, torn down, and replaced, with the residents not being able to afford to remain in the newly rehabilitated areas. The ultimate result of the renewal plan was that Hyde Park did not experience the economic depression that occurred in the surrounding areas and became a racially integrated middle-class neighborhood.

Subdivisions

The University of Chicago
The central campus of the University of Chicago—including Pritzker School of Medicine, the University of Chicago Hospital, the historic Main Quadrangles, and the Booth School of Business—is bounded by Washington Park on the west, 55th Street on the north, University Ave. on the east, and 61st Street on the south, placing most of the University within Hyde Park's southwestern quadrant (with the remainder, south of the Midway, being in Woodlawn). The University also owns a number of additional properties throughout Hyde Park, with many concentrated along a narrow corridor along 59th Street between the central campus and the Metra tracks—including, for example, the University of Chicago Laboratory Schools and International House. Due to the University's proximity, the blocks just east of the central campus are dominated by (privately owned) student and faculty residences.

East Hyde Park

The part of Hyde Park located east of the Metra tracks is locally called East Hyde Park. This area, the part of Hyde Park nearest to Lake Michigan, has a large number of high-rise condominiums, many of them facing the lakefront. In this respect, East Hyde Park differs markedly from the rest of Hyde Park, where the vast majority of residences are either three-story apartment buildings or single-family homes (with only a small number of high-rise condominiums).

South Kenwood
Although the neighborhood bounded by 47th Street on the north, 51st Street (Hyde Park Boulevard) on the south, Cottage Grove Avenue on the west, and Lake Michigan on the east is officially the southern half of the Kenwood community area, it is often considered part of Hyde Park due to the two areas' shared culture and history; "Hyde Park-Kenwood" is thus sometimes applied to this collective area (as in, e.g., the "Hyde Park-Kenwood Historic District"). Some differences are nonetheless apparent: unlike Hyde Park, which is dominated by three- and four-story apartment buildings and modest family homes, southern Kenwood boasts a great many luxurious mansions, built mainly at the end of the nineteenth and the beginning of the twentieth centuries for wealthy Chicagoans. A number of prominent Chicagoans currently reside or own homes in this area, including former U.S. president Barack Obama and Nation of Islam leader Louis Farrakhan. Boxer Muhammad Ali and former Nation of Islam leader Elijah Muhammad also once resided in south Kenwood.

Demographics

Diversity

Hyde Park is a very racially diverse neighborhood. Its population is 47.6% White, 26.8% African American, 12.1% Asian American, 8.5% Hispanic, and 5.0% of other races or of more than one race. There are some differences between the racial demographics of the part of Hyde Park south of 55th Street and the part of Hyde Park north of 55th Street. Residents south of 55th Street are predominantly White and Asian American, with a smaller percentage being African American or Hispanic. North of 55th Street, African Americans make up approximately half of the population and there's a larger percentage of Hispanics.

Hyde Park's location in the center of the predominantly African American South Side as well as the neighborhood's large population of affluent and upper-middle class black residents have made it an important cultural and political hub of Chicago's black community. Many of Chicago's prominent African American politicians live or have lived in Hyde Park, including former Chicago Mayor Harold Washington; former U.S. Senator Carol Moseley Braun, the first ever Black female U.S. senator; and former U.S. President Barack Obama.

Landmarks

The following Hyde Park community area properties have been added to the National Register of Historic Places: Chicago Beach Apartments, Arthur H. Compton House, East Park Towers, Chicago Pile-1, Flamingo-on-the-Lake Apartments, Isadore H. Heller House, Charles Hitchcock Hall, Hotel Del Prado, Hotel Windermere East, Frank R. Lillie House, Robert A. Millikan House, Poinsettia Apartments, Promontory Apartments, Jackson Shore Apartments, Frederick C. Robie House, George Herbert Jones Laboratory, St. Thomas Church and Convent, Shoreland Hotel, German submarine U-505, and University Apartments.

In addition, the NRHP Hyde Park-Kenwood Historic District and Jackson Park Historic Landscape District and Midway Plaisance are located, at least in part, within the Hyde Park community area.

Parks

Promontory Point

Promontory Point is an artificial peninsula that extends into Lake Michigan at 55th Street, providing views of the Downtown Chicago skyline to the north. Promontory Point is a common location for picnicking, sunbathing, and swimming. It made news as the location of the wedding reception between George Lucas and Mellody Hobson in June 2013.

Jackson Park
The southeastern corner of Hyde Park contains the northern end of Jackson Park. Jackson Park consists of lagoons surrounding an island in the middle (called the Wooded Island), on which a small Japanese garden is located. It is home to a large population of beavers and over two dozen species of birds. The Midway Plaisance, a wide boulevard that runs from Stony Island Avenue to Cottage Grove Avenue between 59th and 60th streets, connects Jackson Park to Washington Park (located to the west of Hyde Park).

Jackson Park has been selected by the Obama Foundation as the site of the future Obama Presidential Center.

Shopping districts

53rd, 55th, and 57th streets host most of the businesses in Hyde Park.

53rd Street
53rd Street is Hyde Park's oldest shopping district, lined with many small businesses and restaurants offering various dining options. Harper Court, a small-business-oriented shopping center, extends north of 53rd Street along Harper Avenue. A farmers' market is held there in the summer.

55th Street
The segment of 55th Street between the Metra line and the lake offers a series of ethnic restaurants serving Thai, Japanese, and Korean cuisine. To the west of the Metra line between 54th and 55th streets lies the Hyde Park Shopping Center. The shopping center is anchored by the Trader Joe's grocery store, and also includes a Walgreens, Ace Hardware, Office Depot, Potbelly Sandwich Works, Ascione Bistro, the Bonjour Bakery and Cafe, and upscale French restaurant La Petite Folie.

57th Street
57th Street is noted for its independent bookstores, including Powell's Books Chicago (the original location of a Powell's Books) and the general-readership branch of the Seminary Co-op bookstore, known as "57th Street Books." 57th Street also offers the Medici Restaurant and Bakery, TrueNorth Cafe, and the Salonica Restaurant, along with small grocery stores, hair stylists, and dry cleaners. On the first weekend in June, the venerable 57th Street Art Fair takes up 57th Street between Kimbark and Kenwood avenues.

Museums

 DuSable Museum of African American History (located just outside Hyde Park on the eastern edge of Washington Park)
 Hyde Park Art Center
 Museum of Science and Industry
 Oriental Institute – an archaeology museum (mostly focusing on the ancient Near East) within the University of Chicago.
 Smart Museum of Art – an art museum within the University of Chicago.

Educational institutions

 Catholic Theological Union – a seminary of Roman Catholic religious orders and lay women and men.
 Chicago Theological Seminary – a seminary of the United Church of Christ.
 Lutheran School of Theology at Chicago – a seminary of the Evangelical Lutheran Church in America.
 McCormick Theological Seminary – a seminary of the Presbyterian Church.
 University of Chicago – a private research university.
 University of Chicago Laboratory Schools – a private coeducational nursery-12 school founded by educational reformer John Dewey in 1896.

Churches and houses of worship
 Congregation Rodfei Zedek
 The First Baptist Church of Chicago, the oldest Baptist church in the city
 First Unitarian Church of Chicago
 The Hyde Park Chapel of the Church of Jesus Christ of Latter-day Saints
 The Hyde Park Seventh-day Adventist Church
 Hyde Park Union Church
 KAM Isaiah Israel
 Rockefeller Chapel
 St. Paul & the Redeemer Episcopal Church
 St. Thomas Church and Convent
 57th Street Meeting of Friends, a Quaker meeting for worship

Politics
The Hyde Park community area has supported the Democratic Party in the past two presidential elections by overwhelming margins. In the 2016 presidential election, Hyde Park cast 10,479 votes for Hillary Clinton and 442 votes for Donald Trump (91.9% to 3.9%). In the 2012 presidential election, Hyde Park cast 9,991 votes for Barack Obama and cast 651 votes for Mitt Romney (91.4% to 6.0%).

Transportation
Hyde Park is connected to the rest of the city by CTA buses and the Metra Electric Line. CTA buses provide express service to the downtown, and they also allow transfers to Red Line and Green Line trains to the Loop. The Metra Electric Line, which uses the tracks of the former Illinois Central Railroad, has several stops in Hyde Park and provides service to Millennium Station in the downtown.

CTA bus services:

 2 Hyde Park Express
 4 Cottage Grove
 6 Jackson Park Express
 10 Museum of Science and Industry
 15 Jeffery Local
 28 Stony Island
 55 Garfield

Additional CTA bus services, paid for by the University of Chicago:

 171 University of Chicago/Hyde Park
 172 University of Chicago/Kenwood
 192 University of Chicago Hospitals Express

Notable current and former residents of Hyde Park
Gertrude Abercrombie – painter
Muhammad Ali – boxer
Quentin Young – physician, a founder of Physicians for National Health Care (PNHP)
Bill Ayers – educator and activist
Saul Bellow – writer, 1976 Nobel Prize laureate
Lee Botts – environmentalist
 Chesa Boudin (born 1980), 30th District Attorney of San Francisco (2020-present). He was raised in Hyde Park by his legal guardians Bill Ayers and Bernardine Dohrn.
Carol Moseley Braun – U.S. Senator from Illinois
Oscar Brown Jr. – singer, songwriter, playwright, poet, civil rights activist, and actor.
Paul Butterfield – blues musician
Subrahmanyan Chandrasekhar – astrophysicist, 1983 Nobel Prize laureate
James W. Cronin – physicist, 1980 Nobel Prize laureate
Clarence Darrow – lawyer
Barbara Flynn Currie, former Illinois House of Representatives Majority Leader
Leon Despres – civil rights activist
William Dodd – U.S. Ambassador to Germany
Bernardine Dohrn – lawyer and activist
Paul Douglas – U.S. Senator from Illinois
Arne Duncan – U.S. Secretary of Education
Amelia Earhart (day resident as student of Hyde Park High School) – aviator
Kurt Elling – jazz musician
Louis Farrakhan – leader of the Nation of Islam.
Enrico Fermi – physicist, 1938 Nobel Prize laureate
Marshall Field – retail icon and founder of Marshall Field's
Susan Fiske – social psychologist
Milton Friedman – economist, 1976 Nobel Prize recipient, taught economics at the University of Chicago (1946-1977)
Francis Fukuyama – political scientist
Caroline Glick – Journalist
Dick Gregory – comedian, activist
Austan Goolsbee – economist, writer, senior Obama administration official, former Chair of the Council of Economic Advisers
Bonnie Harris – painter
Hugh Hefner – magazine publisher, founder of Playboy
Maria Hinojosa – journalist
Mahalia Jackson – gospel singer
Elena Kagan – Associate Justice of the Supreme Court
Jim Karvellas – play-by-play sportscaster
 Echo Kellum (born 1982), actor and comedian known for his roles in Arrow and Sean Saves the World. He was a childhood resident of Hyde Park.
Chaka Khan – singer
R. Kelly – singer and convicted sex offender
Karen Lewis (1953-2021) – American labor leader, former reform president of Chicago Teachers Union
Ramsey Lewis – jazz musician
Mary Todd Lincoln – wife of 16th U.S. President Abraham Lincoln
John A. List – Distinguished Service Professor of Economics, University of Chicago
Leopold and Loeb – convicted murderers
Vic Mensa – rapper
Albert Abraham Michelson – physicist, 1907 Nobel Prize laureate
Robert Andrews Millikan – physicist, 1923 Nobel Prize laureate, Robert A. Millikan House is National Historic Landmark
Elijah Muhammad – former leader of the Nation of Islam
NeonSeon – writer and illustrator Seon Ricks
Barack Obama – 44th President of the United States
 Clara Peller (1902–1987), actress best known for her appearances in Where's the beef? campaign of Wendy's. She was a longtime Hyde Park resident.
Richard Posner – former federal judge and senior lecturer at the University of Chicago Law School
Toni Preckwinkle – Cook County Board President, activist 
Kwame Raoul – Illinois Attorney General
Janet D. Rowley – Cytogeneticist and cancer research pioneer
Antonin Scalia – Associate Justice of the Supreme Court, residency at the University of Chicago Law School (1977-1982)
John Paul Stevens – Associate Justice of the Supreme Court
George Stigler – economist, 1982 Nobel Prize laureate
Dana L. Suskind – professor
James Tiptree Jr. – author
Harold Washington – Mayor of Chicago
Bernard Wasserstein – professor
Jody Watley – singer
Henry Clay Work – composer
Hubert Louis Will – federal judge

Gallery

References

External links

Official City of Chicago Hyde Park Map
Hyde Park Historical Society
Hyde Park-Kenwood Community Conference
South East Chicago Commission 

 
Community areas of Chicago
South Side, Chicago
University of Chicago
Populated places established in 1853